Kim Min-jae (born March 20, 1979) is a South Korean actor. He starred in TV series such as Reset (2014), Spy (2015), The Village: Achiara's Secret (2015), and Feel Good to Die (2018).

Career

After debuting in 2000 as part of a small theatre company in Daegu, Kim decided to try his luck in Seoul. While on the set of Lee Chang-dong’s Secret Sunshine (2007), he was inspired to take the entrance exam for the Korea National University of Arts to study film directing. By the time he graduated, Kim realized directing wasn’t for him and resumed his acting career. After a few minor roles in A Little Pond (2010), Poetry (2010), and The Spies (2012), Kim gained recognition for his portrayal of an incorruptible detective in Ryoo Seung-wan’s crime drama The Unjust (2010). Following more supporting roles in blockbusters like Ode to My Father (2014), The King (2016), and The Battleship Island (2017), as well as appearances in critically-acclaimed films The Truth Beneath (2015) and Mothers (2018), Kim joined the main cast of first-time writer-director Kim Min-ho's crime action film Unstoppable along with Don Lee and Song Ji-hyo.

Filmography

Film

Television series

Web series

TV Movies

References

External links
 

1979 births
Living people
South Korean male television actors
South Korean male film actors
South Korean male stage actors
South Korean male musical theatre actors
21st-century South Korean male actors
People from Daegu
Korea National University of Arts alumni